The Grover is a historic apartment building located at Indianapolis, Indiana.  It was built in 1914, and is a three-story, "I"-shaped, red brick building.  It features a recessed entrance with limestone voussoir arch, bay windows on the upper stories, and a limestone frieze.

It was listed on the National Register of Historic Places in 1983.

References

Apartment buildings in Indiana
Residential buildings on the National Register of Historic Places in Indiana
Residential buildings completed in 1914
Residential buildings in Indianapolis
National Register of Historic Places in Indianapolis
Apartment buildings on the National Register of Historic Places